The following persons are notable alumni, living and deceased, of Washington University in St. Louis.

Arts and literature 

Ericka Beckman (BFA 1974): filmmaker
Gustave Haenschen: pianist, composer, recording director (Brunswick Records), orchestral conductor and radio executive
Deanne Bell (BS 2002): host of Discovery Channel's Smash Lab and PBS's Design Squad
Suessa Baldridge Blaine, writer of temperance pageants
Morris Carnovsky (AB): stage and film actor
Douglass Crockwell (BS 1926): commercial artist and experimental filmmaker
Larry Cuba (AB 1972): animator
Robert Culp (attended): television actor
Patricia Degener: artist
Kyle DeWoody (BA 2007): gallery owner
Anita Diamant (AB 1973): novelist
Doug Dillard: bluegrass musician, banjo player for the Dillards
Sean Douglas (LA 2005): multi-platinum songwriter and producer
Richard Eastham (studied prior to World War II): actor
George Pearse Ennis: painter and watercolorist
Lillie Rose Ernst: the leader of The Potters, an artistic group in early 20th Century St. Louis
Jon Feltheimer (AB 1972): CEO of Lionsgate Films
Emily Fridlund: author of History of Wolves
Tom Friedman (BFA 1988): conceptual sculptor
Bernard Fuchs (MFA 1954): painter and illustrator
John Gardner (AB 1955): novelist
Dave Garroway (AB 1936): Today Show host
Cheryl Goldsleger (MFA 1975): artist
Alicia Graf Mack (MA): dancer
Elizabeth Graver (MFA 1999): novelist
Robert Guillaume: stage and television actor
Garth Risk Hallberg (MFA 2001): novelist
Henry Hampton (AB 1961): filmmaker; producer of PBS documentary Eyes on the Prize
John Hartford: bluegrass fiddler and banjo player
Veronica Helfensteller: painter and printer
Daniel Hirsh (AB 2005): actor and filmmaker
Ann Hirsch (BFA 2007): artist
A. E. Hotchner (AB 1940, JD 1940): biographer and novelist (Papa Hemingway, King of the Hill)
Leann Hunley: film and television actress
Fannie Hurst (AB 1909): writer and social activist
Roland C. Jordan: composer and music theorist
Josephine Winslow Johnson (student 1926–1931): Pulitzer Prize-winning author
Stan Kann (AB 1946): theater organist
Johnny Kastl (AB, 1997): television actor (Scrubs)
Hank Klibanoff (AB 1971): author and Pulitzer Prize winner
Zander Lehmann (AB 2009) creator, writer, and producer of the TV show, Casual.
Caryn Mandabach (AB 1970): Emmy award-winning television and film producer of the Cosby Show
Edward Shepherd Mead (AB 1936): playwright (How To Succeed in Business Without Really Trying)
David Merrick (AB 1934): Broadway producer
Ian Monroe (BFA 1995): visual artist
Oliver Nelson (student 1954–1957): jazz musician and composer
David McCheyne Newell: naturalist, writer
Frank Nuderscher: American Impressionist painter and muralist
Al Parker (student 1923-28): illustrator
J. D. Parran (AM 1971): jazz musician
Ebony Patterson (MFA 2006): visual artist
Francis J. Peschka (MFA 1941): puppeteer
Mike Peters (BFA 1965): cartoonist, creator of Mother Goose and Grimm
Judy Pfaff (BFA 1971): visual artist
Dan Piraro (dropped out): cartoonist of Bizarro
Robert Quine (JD 1968): rock guitarist
Harold Ramis (AB 1966): film actor, writer and director

Eugene B. Redmond (MA 1966): poet, critic, civil-rights activist
Irma S. Rombauer (AB): co-author of The Joy of Cooking
Allen Rucker: television writer and novelist
Peter Sarsgaard (AB 1993): actor
Steven Sater: Broadway lyricist, playwright, and poet
Peter Saul (BFA 1956): painter
Michael Shamberg: video artist, producer
William Jay Smith (AB 1939; MA 1941): poet, translator, literary critic and children's author
Dan Storper (AB ’73): founder and CEO of Putumayo World Music
Allan Trautman (AB 1976): actor, puppeteer
Jeff Tremaine (AB 1990): director, producer, and co-creator of MTV's Jackass
Kristin Bauer van Straten: television actress on True Blood
Anne Valente (AB 2003): novelist, short story writer
Andrew Volpe: lead singer and rhythm guitarist for rock band Ludo
Lauren Weinstein (AB 1998): cartoonist
June Weybright, composer
Luke Whisnant (MFA 1982): novelist, short story writer
Mary Wickes (AB 1930): stage, film, and television actress
Tennessee Williams (student 1936-37): playwright
Olly Wilson (AB 1959): composer
Louise Yazbeck, composer
Eva Dave : Gujarati language writer

Architecture and design

Charles Eames: designer, architect, filmmaker.
Hugh Ferriss (B.Arch 1911, M.Arch 1928): architect
Alan Goldberg (1954): architect
Gyo Obata (B.Arch 1945): architect; cofounder and chairman of Hellmuth, Obata & Kassabaum
James F. O'Gorman (B.Arch 1956): architectural historian and author
C. P. Wang (M.Arch 1973): architect for Taipei 101, the world's tallest building as of 2005

Business

John H. Biggs (PhD): former CEO of TIAA-CREF
Nordahl Brue (JD): founder of Bruegger's Bagels
Donald L. Bryant Jr. (JD 1967): owner of Bryant Family Vineyard 
William H. Danforth (AB 1892): founder of Ralston Purina
Arnold W. Donald (BSME 1977): CEO of Carnival Cruise Lines; former CEO of Merisant
Steve Fossett (MBA 1968): options trader, balloonist, and adventurer
Sam Fox (BSBA 1951): founder, chairman, CEO, and owner of Harbour Group Industries
Yinka Faleti (JD): former executive director of the nonprofit Forward Through Ferguson and senior vice president of United Way of Greater St. Louis
Jordan French (JD 2010): cofounder and CMO BeeHex
Avram Glazer (BSBA 1982): president and CEO of the Zapata Corporation and joint chairman of Manchester United
George Gatch (BA 1986): CEO of JPMorgan Asset Management
Robert Hernreich (AB 1967): Co-Owner Sacramento Kings
Douglas Lowenstein (AB 1973): founder and former president of Entertainment Software Association, former president and CEO of Private Equity Council
Jim McKelvey (AB 1987): co-founder and director of Block, Inc.
Wade Miquelon (MBA 1989): CFO of Walgreens
Ernesto Fajardo (MBA): president and CEO of Alpina
Edward Mueller (MBA):  president and CEO of Qwest Communications
Charles Nagel (JD 1872): United States Secretary of Commerce and Labor; founder of the U.S. Chamber of Commerce
Mike O'Brien (BA 1994): Great Lakes project director of Bluewater Wind
Dave Peacock (MBA 2000): CEO of Anheuser-Busch
Andrew Puzder (JD 1978): CEO of CKE Restaurants
Michael L. Riordan (AB 1979): founder of Gilead Sciences
Aaron Selber, Jr.: studied in the School of Retailing; businessman and philanthropist in Shreveport, Louisiana
William Shaw (MBA 1972): president and COO of Marriott International Inc.
Karen Sheriff (BA 1979): president and CEO of Q9 Networks Inc.
George Fox Steedman (1871–1940), inventor and businessman.
Louis B. Susman (JD 1962): vice chairman of Citigroup Global Markets
Jack C. Taylor (student through 1944): founder of Enterprise Rent-A-Car; no. 14 on Forbes 400 Richest Americans in 2006
Jim Weddle (AB 1977, MBA): managing partner at Edward Jones Investments
John B. Whyte (attended two years in 1950s): developer of Fire Island Pines, New York
Brian Willison (BFA 1995): Executive Director of Parsons Institute for Information Mapping
Lewis Wolff (MBA 1961): hotel developer and owner of the Oakland Athletics
George Zimmer (AB 1970): founder of Men's Wearhouse

Education and academics
James F. Barker (AM 1973): president of Clemson University
Francis J. Beckwith (MJS): former associate director of Baylor University's J. M. Dawson Institute of Church-State Studies
Jessie Bernard (Ph.D. 1935): sociologist; feminist scholar
Nordahl Brue (JD): Board of Trustees member at Grinnell College
Ewald W. Busse (M.D.): former dean of the Duke University School of Medicine
Henry Ware Eliot (AB 1863): father of poet T. S. Eliot; former president of the Academy of Sciences of St. Louis
Thomas Lamb Eliot (AB 1862, AM 1866): founding board member and president of Reed College
Lillie Rose Ernst (Class 1892): one of the first 12 women to graduate at WU and co-founder of the Washington University Women's Alumnae Association
Deborah A. Freund (AB 1973): president of Claremont Graduate University
Nathan O. Hatch (AM 1972, PhD 1974): president of Wake Forest University
Raelynn Hillhouse (AB): novelist, political scientist, national security expert
Edward Singleton Holden (SB 1866): fifth president of the University of California; director of the Lick Observatory
Robert C. Kolodny (MD 1969): author of books on human sexuality
Joyce Ladner (AM 1966, PhD 1968): sociologist and activist
Max Lerner (AM 1925): intellectual, critic, and author
Richard Lischer (MA 1967) theologian and professor at Duke Divinity School
Donald Livingston (PhD 1965): constitutional scholar
John L. Loos (PhD c. 1953): historian at Louisiana State University, researcher of the Lewis and Clark Expedition
Richard V. E. Lovelace (BS Physics 1964): astrophysicist and plasma physicist at Cornell University
Julius B. Maller (AB 1925): educator and sociologist
Richard McKelvey (MA 1967): Political Scientist, specialized in mathematical theories of voting
Horace Mitchell (AB 1968, MA 1969, PhD 1974): president of California State University Bakersfield
Jonathan D. Moreno (PhD 1977): David and Lyn Silfen University Professor, University of Pennsylvania
Daniel Nathans (MD 1954): former president of Johns Hopkins University
H. Richard Niebuhr (AM 1917): theologian
Eric P. Newman (JD 1935): American numismatist
Maurice H. Rees, Medical educator and Dean of University of Colorado School of Medicine from 1925 to 1945
Abram L. Sachar (AB 1920, AM 1920): founding president of Brandeis University
Elizabeth Scarlett (AB 1983): author of books on Spanish literature and film
Pepper Schwartz (AB 1967, MA 1969): sociologist and sexologist
Hollis Taylor: zoomusicologist
Song Ja (M.B.A. 1962, D.B.A. 1967): former president of Yonsei University; South Korean Minister of Education
Charles Van Ravenswaay (AB 1933, AM 1934): historian
Bruce Rittmann (B.S., M.S. 1974): Regents' Professor at Arizona State University
Chia-Wei Woo (MA, PhD): founding president of The Hong Kong University of Science and Technology; first Asian American to head a major U.S. university (San Francisco State University)

Journalism and media

Bill Dedman (student 1978–1981): Pulitzer Prize-winning investigative reporter and author of bestseller "Empty Mansions"
Lynne "Angel" Cooper Harvey (AB, AM): producer of Paul Harvey News; inducted into the Radio Hall of Fame
William G. Hyland (BA): editor of Foreign Affairs (1984–1993)
Michael Isikoff (AB 1974): author and journalist
Richard F. Janssen (BA 1954): journalist
Hank Klibanoff (AB 1971): Pulitzer Prize-winning author and former managing editor of Atlanta Journal-Constitution
Anthony Kuhn (AB 1985): NPR Correspondent in Beijing, China
Marguerite Martyn (ca. 1880-1948), reporter and artist
Condé Nast (LLB 1897): publisher of Vogue
Mike Peters (BFA 1965): Pulitzer Prize-winning editorial cartoonist; creator of "Mother Goose and Grimm"

Politics, law, and government

 Vishal Amin: Intellectual Property Enforcement Coordinator
 Glendy B. Arnold: St. Louis judge
Carl J. Artman (JD): Assistant Secretary of the Interior for Indian Affairs, and head of the Bureau of Indian Affairs 2007–08
John C. Bates (BA 1863): served as Chief of Staff of the United States Army in 1906.
Robert E. Bacharach: Judge of the United States Court of Appeals for the Tenth Circuit
Lemma Barkaloo: First woman admitted to the Missouri bar and the first woman to try a case in an American court
Albert I Beach (JD 1907): 42nd Mayor of Kansas City, 1924-1930
Brian Benczkowski (JD 1994): Former Assistant Attorney General for the Criminal Division of the United States Department of Justice
Marion T. Bennett (JD 1938): Senior Judge of the United States Court of Appeals for the Federal Circuit, 1986-2000
David Bernhard (JD 1985): Judge on the 19th Judicial Circuit Court of Virginia (Fairfax), 2017-Current
Tayeb Bouzid (MSCE 1985): Minister of Higher Education and Scientific Research in Algeria.
James Joseph Butler (JD): Member of the U.S. House of Representatives from Missouri's 12th congressional district 
Ben Cannon (AB 1999): State Representative to the Oregon House of Representatives, 2007–2011, and Rhodes Scholar
Henry S. Caulfield (JD 1895): Governor of Missouri, 1929–1933
Michael Cherry (JD 1969): justice, Supreme Court of Nevada, 2006–present
Clark M. Clifford (LLB 1928): U.S. Secretary of Defense, 1968–69; former presidential advisor
Earl Thomas Coleman (JD 1969): U.S. congressman from Missouri, 1977–1993
Sharon Johnson Coleman (JD 1984): Judge of the United States District Court for the Northern District of Illinois
Irving Ben Cooper (LLB 1925): Senior Judge of the United States District Court for the Southern District of New York (1972-1996)
Phoebe Couzins (LLB 1871): first female U.S. Marshal; feminist; leader in the Women's Suffrage Movement
Ethan Corson (BS, JD): Member of the Kansas Senate from the 7th district, 2021-Current
Charles L. Craig (1872-1935), New York City Comptroller
Barbara Ann Crancer (JD): Associate Circuit Judge of the 21st Missouri Circuit Court from 1992-2008
Edward Coke Crow (LLB 1879): 23rd Attorney General of Missouri from 1897–1905, advisor to Missouri Governor Lloyd Crow Stark (1937–1941)
Joseph F. Cunningham (JD 1952): served on the Illinois Supreme Court.
Thomas Bradford Curtis (LLB 1935): Primary driver behind the Civil Rights Act of 1964 and member of the U.S. House of Representatives from Missouri
Hal Daub (BS 1963): U.S. congressman from Nebraska, 1981–1989; mayor of Omaha, 1995–2001
Dwight F. Davis (LLB): founder of Davis Cup, and 49th U.S. Secretary of War
Stephanie D. Davis (JD 1992): first Black woman from Michigan to serve on the United States Court of Appeals for the Sixth Circuit
Alan J. Dixon (LLB 1949): U.S. Senator from Illinois, 1981–93
Alexander Monroe Dockery (MD 1865): Governor of Missouri, 1901–1905
Daniel Draper (JD): Speaker of the Oklahoma House of Representatives, 1979-1983

Leonidas C. Dyer (JD 1893): U.S. congressman from Missouri, 1915–1933
Edward Cranch Eliot of the Eliot family (AB 1878, LLB 1880, AM 1881): former president of the American Bar Association
Conway Elder (JD 1905): Supreme Court of Missouri justice from 1921 to 1922
Rocky Fitzsimmons: member of the West Virginia Senate
Audrey Goldstein Fleissig (JD 1980): Judge of the United States District Court for the Eastern District of Missouri
Sam Fox (AB 1951): former United States Ambassador to Belgium
James F. Fulbright (born 1877): U.S. Representative from Missouri
David R. Francis (AB 1870): mayor of St. Louis, 1885–89; Governor of Missouri, 1889–93; U.S. Secretary of Interior, 1896–97; U.S. Ambassador to Russia
Joseph H. Goldenhersh (JD):  Illinois Supreme Court judge from 1970-1987
Raymond W. Gruender (JD/MBA 1987): current judge, United States Court of Appeals for the Eighth Circuit
George F. Gunn Jr. (JD 1955): Supreme Court of Missouri justice, and later a United States district judge of the United States District Court for the Eastern District of Missouri.
Jean Constance Hamilton (JD 1971): current judge, United States District Court for the Eastern District of Missouri
Moses Harrison (JD): Illinois Appellate Court and Illinois Supreme Court judge
Harry B. Hawes (JD 1896): U.S. Senator from Missouri, 1926–1933
John Hayden Jr. : Police Commissioner of the St.Louis Police Department
Chic Hecht (BS 1949): U.S. Senator from Nevada, 1983–89
Thomas C. Hennings, Jr. (JD 1926): U.S. Senator from Missouri, 1951–1960
William L. Igoe (JD 1902): U.S. congressman from Missouri, 1913–1921
Alphonso Jackson (JD 1972): U.S. Secretary of Housing and Urban Development, 2004–2008
Jonathan Kanter (JD): Nominee to serve as Assistant Attorney General for the Antitrust Division
Chris Koster (MBA 2002): Attorney General of Missouri
Jasna Matić (MBA 2001): Minister of Telecommunications and Information Society of Serbia
Siniša Mali (MBA 1999): Minister of Finance of Serbia
Andrew McCabe (JD 1993): Deputy Director of the FBI
Abner Mikva (BA 1948): Judge of the United States Court of Appeals for the District of Columbia Circuit, 1979-1994; U.S. Representative for Illinois's 10th congressional district, 1975-1979; U.S. Representative for Illinois's 2nd congressional district, 1969-1973
Victor J. Miller (JD): mayor of St. Louis, 1925 to 1933
Quinton Lucas (BA): mayor of Kansas City, Missouri, 2019 to 2023
John Francis Nangle (JD 1948): former chief judge, United States District Court for the Eastern District of Missouri, 1983–1990
Roscoe C. Patterson (JD 1897): U.S. Senator from Missouri, 1929–1935
Catherine D. Perry (JD 1981): current judge, United States District Court for the Eastern District of Missouri

Phil Radford (BA 1998): environmental, clean energy and democracy leader; Executive Director, Greenpeace
 Cecilia Razovsky: social worker and leader in Jewish immigration efforts during World War II as part of the National Refugee Service, the United Nations Relief and Rehabilitation Administration, and the American Jewish Joint Distribution Committee 
Tony Ribaudo (1962): majority leader of the Missouri House of Representatives, 1977–1997
Kenneth J. Rothman (AB, JD): Lieutenant Governor of Missouri, 1981–1985
Steven Rothman (JD 1977): U.S. Congressmen from New Jersey, 1997–2013
David Rubenstein (BA 1981): advocate, founding executive director of Save Darfur Coalition
Phyllis Schlafly (AB 1944, JD 1978): author, lawyer, conservative and antifeminist activist
Adam Shapiro (AB 1993): co-founder of the International Solidarity Movement
Mike Simpson (DMD 1977): U.S. congressman from Idaho, 1999–present
Rodney W. Sippel (JD 1980): current judge, United States District Court for the Eastern District of Missouri
Luther Ely Smith (JD 1897): founder of Gateway Arch National Park
Ralph Tyler Smith (JD 1940): U.S. Senator from Illinois, 1969–1970
Selden P. Spencer (JD 1886): U.S. Senator from Missouri, 1918–1925

Leonor Sullivan (1923): first female U.S. congressional representative from Missouri, 1953–1977
Louis Susman (JD): current United States Ambassador to Great Britain
Eben Swift: U.S. Army Major General
Jim Talent (AB 1978): U.S. Senator from Missouri, 2003–2007
Lieutenant General Jeffrey W. Talley (MLA 88): retired, 32nd Chief of Army Reserve (CAR) and 7th Commanding General, United States Army Reserve Command (USARC) 2012-2016
Richard B. Teitelman (JD 1973): current justice, Supreme Court of Missouri
James R. Thompson (AB 1956): Governor of Illinois, 1977–1991
Raymond Tucker (BS 1920): mayor of St. Louis, 1953–1965
Tarisa Watanagase (PhD): governor of the Bank of Thailand, 2006
William H. Webster (JD 1949): 14th director of the CIA and the 6th director of the FBI
David C. Weiss (1979): current U.S. Attorney for the District of Delaware
Xenophon P. Wilfley (JD 1899): U.S. Senator from Missouri, 1918
George Howard Williams (JD 1897): U.S. Senator from Missouri, 1925–1926
Sukehiro Hasegawa (PhD 1974): former Special Representative of the Secretary-General for East Timor, May 2004 - September 2006
Rochelle Walensky (BA 1991): Director of the Centers for Disease Control and Prevention
Shien Biau Woo (PhD 1964): Asian American political activist; former Lieutenant Governor of Delaware
Chen Zhangliang (PhD 1987): Vice Governor of Guangxi, People's Republic of China.

Science, engineering, and medicine

 Caroline Thomas Rumbold, (1877 –1949), botanist
Richard Askey (BA 1955): mathematician known for his work on special functions 
J. Michael Bailey (AB 1979): psychologist, professor, researcher on sexual orientation
Geoffrey Ballard (PhD 1963): developed Fuel cells; member of Order of Canada; founder of Ballard Power Systems
Col. Robert Behnken (BSPhy 1992, BSME 1992): NASA astronaut, engineer, and former Chief of the Astronaut Office
Judson A. Brewer (PhD 2002, MD 2004): neuroscientist and psychiatrist, director of research and innovation at Brown University's Mindfulness Center
Ewald W. Busse (M.D.): dean of the Duke University School of Medicine (1974–1982)
Woo Chia-wei (MA, PhD): physicist; founding president of Hong Kong University of Science and Technology; president of San Francisco State University
Clyde Cowan (AM, PhD 1949): physicist and co-discoverer of the neutrino
Elizabeth A. Craig: biochemistry professor at University of Wisconsin–Madison; member of the National Academy of Sciences
Lorrie Cranor (BS 1992, MS 1993, MS 1996, D.Sc 1996): Professor at Carnegie Mellon University; Served as chief technologist at the Federal Trade Commission
Arnold W. Donald (BS): President and CEO of Juvenile Diabetes Research Foundation
Carl Eckart (BS, MS 1923): noted physicist; member of National Academy of Sciences; known for Wigner-Eckart theorem, Eckart-Young theorem
Eric Green (MD PhD 1987): Director of the National Human Genome Research Institute
Philip Gressman (AB 2001): mathematician known for work on harmonic analysis
Lee Harrison III (BFA 1952, BS 1959): engineer; Emmy winner for invention of computer animation
Albert G. Hill (BS 1930, MS 1934): professor of physics at MIT; head of Lincoln Lab and Draper Lab; director of research at Institute for Defense Analyses
Julian W. Hill (BS 1924): chemist; co-inventor of nylon
Georg Jander (BS 1987): plant biologist at the Boyce Thompson Institute and Cornell University
Marc Kamionkowski (BA 1987): astrophysicist, particle theorist, and cosmologist
William Kincaid (BS 1988): costume manufacturer and artist
Edwin Krebs (MD 1943): winner of Nobel laureate in medicine for work with protein phosphorylation as a biological regulatory mechanism
Appu Kuttan: founder of the National Education Foundation
Alexander Langsdorf, Jr. (BS 1932): Manhattan project physicist; vocal critic of nuclear proliferation
J. C. R. Licklider (BS 1937): pioneer in computer science and artificial intelligence
Stan London (MD 1949): St. Louis Cardinals and St. Louis Hawks team physician
Walter E. Massey (AM 1966, PhD 1966): physicist, director of the National Science Foundation, president of Morehouse College
W. E. Moerner (BS 1975): Stanford University professor; winner of 2014 Nobel Prize in Chemistry; pioneer in single molecule spectroscopy and member of the National Academy of Sciences
Robert H. Mohlenbrock (PhD 1957): botanist and author
Ben Moreell (BS 1913): U.S. Navy admiral; founder of the Navy's Seabees construction battalions
Benjamin Movsas (MD 1990): chairman of radiation oncology at the Henry Ford Hospital.
Daniel Nathans (MD 1954): Nobel laureate in medicine for the discovery of restriction enzymes; awarded National Medal of Science
Alton Ochsner (MD): surgeon and medical researcher at The Ochsner Clinic in New Orleans
Fred Olsen (PhD): inventor of the ball propellant manufacturing process
Michael E. Phelps (PhD 1970): developed PET scan
Rob Phillips (PhD 1989): noted biophysicist; professor at Caltech
Larry Robinson (PhD 1984):  academic, administrator, chemist and the current President of Florida A&M University (FAMU).
 Pejman Salimpour: physician who successfully challenged the legality of exclusivity agreements between hospitals and doctors' groups
Peter Shawhan (BS 1990): LIGO physicist; co-recipient of Special Breakthrough Prize in Fundamental Physics
Joseph Edward Smadel (MD): inaugural recipient of the Albert Lasker Award for Clinical Medical Research
Sol Spiegelman (PhD 1944): molecular biologist
Samuel Stanley (MD 1980): 5th President of Stony Brook University
Earl Sutherland (MD 1942): Nobel laureate in medicine for elucidating the mechanisms of the actions of hormones
T. Bill Sutherland (BA 1963): theoretical and mathematical physicist
Thea Tlsty (PhD 1980), professor of pathology at the University of California, San Francisco.
Kenneth S. Wagoner (MA, 1934; PhD 1938), experimental psychologist
Leana Wen (MD): former President of Planned Parenthood, former Baltimore City Health Commissioner
Michael J. Wendl (1958): engineering in terrain following technology and energy management theory
Walter Wyman (MD 1873): 3rd US Surgeon General
Ellen W. Zegura (BS 1987, MS 1990, D.Sc 1993): Professor at Georgia Tech
Ernst K. Zinner (PhD 1973): astrophysicist

Sports

Bill Beckmann (born 1907): former professional baseball pitcher for St. Louis Cardinals and Philadelphia Athletics
Amelia Boone (JD 2009):  American obstacle racer
Joe Bukant (born 1915): professional football player; joined United States Navy
Kendall Gretsch (BS 2014): Three-time Paralympic gold medalist in women's 6km sitting biathlon event, women's 12km sitting event, and paratriathlon event
Jimmy Conzelman (BS 1917): professional football player and coach; enshrined in Pro Football Hall of Fame
Dwight F. Davis (LLB): founder of the Davis Cup international tennis competition
Bill DeWitt (born 1902): former general manager and owner of the St. Louis Browns and Cincinnati Reds, chairman of the board of the Chicago White Sox, and president of the Detroit Tigers
Bing Devine (born 1916): general manager of the St. Louis Cardinals from 1957-1964
Caleb Durbin (BA 2021): professional baseball player for Atlanta Braves
Scott Garson (born 1976): American college basketball coach at Santa Clara University. Formerly was an assistant coach at UCLA, Utah and head coach at College of Idaho
Warren Gill (born 1878):  professional baseball player who played first base for the Pittsburgh Pirates
Harvey Jablonsky: football player; U.S Army veteran; enshrined in College Football Hall of Fame
Bill Jennings: a shortstop in Major League Baseball.
Shelby Jordan (BA 1974): professional football player; enshrined in College Football Hall of Fame
Bob Light: College basketball and tennis coach
Kurt Krieger: first person born in Austria to play Major League Baseball 
AnnMaria De Mars: 1984 Judo World Champion, mother of Ronda Rousey
Jennifer Martz: National Volleyball Player of the Year
Dal Maxvill (BS): professional baseball player, former St. Louis Cardinals general manager
Muddy Ruel (JD): professional baseball catcher; member of 1924 World Champion Washington Senators
George Herbert Walker (LLB 1897): founder of Walker Cup in golf; grandfather and great-grandfather of Presidents George H. W. Bush and George W. Bush, respectively
Charley Winner: longtime coach in the National Football League
Pete Wismann (born 1923): former center/linebacker for the San Francisco 49ers
Lewis Wolff (MBA 1961): owner of the Oakland Athletics

References

Alumni
 List
Washington University alumni